Jharkhand is divided into five Administrative Divisions namely South Chotanagpur, North Chotanagpur, Kolhan, Palamu and Santhal Pargana.

Background
Jharkhand state was created as 28th state of India by the Bihar Re-organization Act on 15 November 2000. State was created due to its underdevelopment and social justice. Jharkhand has 5 neighborhood states e.g. Bihar on the North, Orissa on the South, Chhattisgarh and Uttar Pradesh on the west  West Bengal on the East.

Alphabetical listing of divisions

See also
 Districts of Jharkhand

References

Divisions of Jharkhand
Geography of Jharkhand